Grewia flavescens, called rough-leaved raisin, sandpaper raisin, and donkey berry (a name it shares with Grewia bicolor), is a species of flowering plant in the family Malvaceae, native to subSaharan Africa, Yemen, Saudi Arabia, and India. It is considered to be an underutilized crop, both for its fruit and its use for livestock forage.

Gallery

References

flavescens
Flora of West Tropical Africa
Flora of West-Central Tropical Africa
Flora of Northeast Tropical Africa
Flora of East Tropical Africa
Flora of South Tropical Africa
Flora of Southern Africa
Flora of Yemen
Flora of Saudi Arabia
Flora of India
Plants described in 1804